NSB Class XXII is a steam locomotive class designed by the Norwegian State Railways  exclusively for use on the Setesdal Line.

External links
Entry at Norwegian Railway Club

2-4-2T locomotives
Class N22
Dübs locomotives
Thune locomotives
Steam locomotives of Norway
Railway locomotives introduced in 1894
3 ft 6 in gauge locomotives